The 1998 Cork Senior Hurling Championship was the 110th staging of the Cork Senior Hurling Championship since its establishment by the Cork County Board in 1887. The draw for the opening fixtures took place on 14 December 1997. The championship ended on 1 November 1998.

Imokilly entered the championship as the defending champions.

On 1 November 1998, Imokilly won the championship following a 1-10 to 1-05 defeat of Blackrock in the final. This was their second championship title overall and their second in succession. I
Brian Cunningham of St. Finbarr's was the championship's top scorer with 3-23.

Team changes

To Championship

Promoted from the Cork Intermediate Hurling Championship
 Cloyne

Results

First round

Second round

Quarter-finals

Semi-finals

Final

Championship statistics

Top scorers

Overall

In a single game

Miscellaneous

 It was the third year in-a-row that the championship title went to a divisional side.
 Blackrock qualify for the final for first time sine 1986.
 Newtownshandrum return to the SHC for the first time since 1984.

References

Cork Senior Hurling Championship
Cork Senior Hurling Championship